The 2009 European Figure Skating Championships was a senior international figure skating competition in the 2008–09 season. Medals were awarded in the disciplines of men's singles, ladies' singles, pair skating, and ice dancing. The event was held from 20 to 25 January 2009 at the Hartwall Areena in Helsinki, Finland.

Qualification
The competition was open to skaters from European ISU member nations who had reached the age of 15 before 1 July 2008. The corresponding competition for non-European skaters was the 2009 Four Continents Championships. National associations selected their entries based on their own criteria. Based on the results of the 2008 European Championships, each country was allowed between one and three entries per discipline. The following countries earned more than the minimum.

Competition notes
Brian Joubert won his third European title, as did Aliona Savchenko / Robin Szolkowy in the pairs event. It was the first time at the top of the podium for Laura Lepistö and Jana Khokhlova / Sergei Novitski.

Lepistö became the first Finn to win the ladies' single title, and second overall after Susanna Rahkamo / Petri Kokko's 1995 ice dancing title. With Susanna Pöykiö winning bronze, it was also the first time Finns took two spots on the European podium.

Results

Men

Ladies

Pairs

Ice dancing

References

External links

 Official site
 
 Official competitors list

European Figure Skating Championships
European
E
International figure skating competitions hosted by Finland
2000s in Helsinki
January 2009 sports events in Europe
International sports competitions in Helsinki